Shaanxi History Museum, which is located to the northwest of the Giant Wild Goose Pagoda in the ancient city Xi'an, in the Shaanxi province of China, is one of the first huge state museums with modern facilities in China and one of the largest. The museum houses over 370,000 items, including murals, paintings, pottery, coins, as well as bronze, gold, and silver objects. The modern museum was built between 1983 and 2001 and its appearance recalls the architectural style of the Tang Dynasty.

History 

Shaanxi History Museum was constructed from 1983. It was opened to the public on 20 June 1991. The museum is in an area of 65,000 square meters, with a building area of 55,600 square meters, cultural relics storerooms of 8,000 square meters, exhibition halls of 11,000 square meters, and a collection of 370,000 objects. The museum is architecturally in the Tang style, with a "hall in center, storied buildings in corners". It is elegant and dignified, on a large scale, with a combination of traditional architecture and modern technology, which embodies folk tradition and local features.

Shaanxi was the ancient imperial capital of China, having been the seat of more than 13 feudal dynasties, including the Zhou, Qin, Han, and Tang dynasties. The province is rich in cultural relics. With the completion of the Shaanxi History Museum, it collected over 370,000 precious relics which were unearthed in Shaanxi Province, including bronze wares, pottery figures, and mural paintings in Tang tombs.  In particular there are large numbers of pottery Tang dynasty tomb figures from the tombs of the imperial family around the city.

Since the opening of the museum, it has followed the policy of collecting, conservation, publicizing, education, and scientific research, using its many historical relics, and conducted various types of display. The relics have also been exhibited overseas in cities in Japan, France, the United States, the United Kingdom and Germany.

Collection highlights 
Highlights of the museum include:

 Fossils of the Lantian Man (preceded Peking Man),
 The Deer Pattern Eaves Tile from the Qin Dynasty,
 The many objects from the Tang Hejia Village hoard, found in 1970, deposited around 755 during the An Lushan Rebellion.
 The Kneeling Archer, a 120 cm tall figure unearthed in 1977 from Emperor Qin Shi Huang's tomb
 The Four Footed Li, a Shang Dynasty bronze cooking utensil,
 Playing Polo, a Tang Dynasty mural of people playing polo in China,
 Frescos and pottery tomb figures from the tomb of Princess Li Xianhui, 705, Tang dynasty
 The Empress's Seal, a jade seal from the Western Han Dynasty, excavated near the tomb of Emperor Gao Zu, the first emperor of the Han Dynasty – one of the most important imperial seals ever found in China.

Gallery

Location 

The address of the museum is 91 East XiaoZhai Road, Xi'an, Shaanxi Province, China.

See also
 List of museums in China

References

External links

Shaanxi History Museum website
Shanxi History Museum information

Museums in Xi'an
History of Shaanxi
Buildings and structures completed in 2001
Museums established in 1991
1991 establishments in China
National first-grade museums of China